Quartiere (also known as Neighborhood) is a 1987 Italian drama film  written and directed by Silvano Agosti.

The film was entered into the main competition at the 44th edition of the Venice Film Festival.

Plot

Cast 
  
 Victoria Zinny as The Mother
 Dario Ghirardi as The Father
 Valeria Sabel as The Aunt
 Lino Salemme  as Giulio 
 Alessandra Corsale as The Sister
 Paola Agosti as The Other Mother
 Sergio Bini  as Nino

References

External links

1987 drama films
1987 films
Films directed by Silvano Agosti
Italian drama films
Films scored by Ennio Morricone
1980s Italian-language films
1980s Italian films